Farishta is a Bhojpuri-language Indian drama film produced by S. S. Reddy, directed by Lal Babu Pandit and written by Arvind Tiwari. It stars Khesari Lal Yadav, Meghasri, Pooja Ganguly, Sanjay Pandey in the main roles. The story revolves around Murari (Khesari Lal Yadav), a mentally challenged person, who is not accepted by his family.

Plot
The story revolves around Murari (Khesari Lal Yadav) a mentally challenged person who is not accepted in his family.

Cast

 Khesari Lal Yadav as Murari, a mentally challenged person
 Meghasri
 Pooja Ganguly
 Sanjay Pandey, Murari's father
 Amit Shukla
 Sraddha Naval, Murari's mother
 Prakash Jais
 Sonu Pandey
 Rinku Bharti
 Khushboo Yadav

Production

Development 
This was the first time Khesari Lal Yadav was doing a character role. Khesari didn't take bath for 20 days to fit in the character and remained in the costume.

Filming 
The principal photography commenced in May 2022 in Lucknow with the name "Farishte".

Music 
Music of the film is given by Krishna Bedardi. The song Pagale Bana Di Ram Ji received 3.6 million views on youtube within 24 hours of its release.

Marketing 
The first look of the film was revealed on January 24th. The trailer of the film released on YouTube on February 24th and got over 10 lakh views in first 24 hours and trended on YouTube not only in India but also in Dubai.

Release
The film released on 9th March 2023 in the theatres across India, on the occasion of Holi.

Reception 
The film received great response from the audience and ran housefull in the theatres of Bihar, Uttar Pradesh and Mumbai.

References

Indian drama films
Bhojpuri-language films